Dr. Mandan Mishra was a noted Sanskrit scholar from India and founder of Shri Lal Bahadur Shastri Rashtriya Sanskrit Vidyapeetha. In 2000 he was awarded Padma Shri by Government of India for his excellent and devoted work in the field of Sanskrit.

Early life 

He was born on 7 June 1929 in a small village (Hanutiya) around 50 km away from Jaipur in Rajasthan who made it very big in the world for his dedicated work in Sanskrit. His father was a Hindu Scholar and mother a house wife. He is the eldest of the 5 brothers and 2 sisters. He was married to bharti mishra. He took his last breath on 15 November 2001. He was survived with 1 daughter (recently expired) and 3 sons.his eldest son shri bhaskar mishra is a professor in Sanskrit at the lal bahadur shastri university. His second son shri ravi mishra (with three children two daughters and a son Akshat Mishra who is serving as Awards Head at Franchise India Holdings Limited.)  is serving as the general manager in jk tyres and the third son shri Arun Mishra is a businessman. Dr. Mandan Mishra took his primary education from Amarsar and high education under the guidance of Shri Pattabhiramshastriji. The relationship and the principle of this teacher-student is famous all over the world.

His career 

He was the only Vice-Chancellor of such repute that almost all presidents and Prime Ministers of India appreciated his knowledge and dedication towards Sanskrit language. Under his guidance and leadership a group went to USA to promote Sanskrit as a language.

Dr. Mandan Mishra started his career as a lecturer in Maharaja Sanskrit College, Jaipur. He was later upgraded as a Professor. Dr. Mandan Mishra was elected as Minister in 1956 and Minister-in-Chief in 1959 to All India Sanskrit Literature Association, a representative Association of Sanskrit established by Pt. Madan Mohan Malaviya. By then All India Sanskrit Literature Association was in dire need of a young leader like Dr. Mishra. He put in a new column of energy to the Association and opened branches in all the States. Shastri ji obtained the services of Dr. Mandan Mishra from the Government of Rajasthan for his great task and appointed him as a permanent Director of the Shri Lal Bahadur Shastri Sanskrit Vidhyapeetha.

World Sanskrit Century plan was commissioned under his direction and that gave rise to a new era of Sanskrit in the country. An historical session of all India Sanskrit Literature Association could also be materialised in Calcutta in 1961, which was inaugurated by the first President of India Dr. Rajendra Prasad, due to his noble efforts and initiative. This session came out as a milestone for the development of Sanskrit and concluded with the noble decision of establishing a Sanskrit Vidyapeetha in New Delhi.

On the insistence of Dr. Rajendra Prasad eminent personalities like the then chairperson of the association Shri Narahari Vishnu, Governor of Punjab, Shri Balawant Nagesh Dattar, Minister of State for Home, Government of India, Shri Shanti Prasad, a great Industrialist etc. sought the services of Dr. Mishra in New Delhi from Government of Rajasthan as a result of which he came to Delhi and founded Sanskrit Vidyapeetha in New Delhi in 1962.

There was no provision of providing assistance to Sanskrit Institutions during that time. Each Institution would then be getting a maximum of Rs. 1000/- as assistance per annum from Delhi Government. With Dr. Mishra's noble effort, Delhi administration decided to extend 95% assistance to all the Sanskrit Institutions. As a result of which, each Sanskrit Institution today is getting lakhs of rupees as assistance from Government. Dr. Mishra took with himself the confidence of all the institutions simultaneously along with him.

Fortunately Prime Minister of India Shri Lal Bahadur Shastri accepted the chairmanship of All India Sanskrit Literature Association and Dr Mishra was again elected as its Minister-in-Chief. On a request from Shri Shastriji, Dr. Mishra do away with the desire of an imminent foreseeable power in politics which would otherwise be bestowed upon him on the basis of his 17 years of selfless Service in Rajasthan and the reputation he had won amongst social sectors and public at large and dedicated his entire life for Sanskrit.

After unexpected demise of Shri Shastriji, with Dr. Mishra's effort and request from Dr. Sampurnanandaji, Smt. Indira Gandhi took over as President of the Association and Vidyapeetha and in the honour of Shri Shastri he renamed the Vidyapeetha as Lal Bahadur Shastri Sanskrit Vidyapeetha and dedicated it to the Government of India. Dr. Mishra remained the founder director of the Institution. His consistent efforts bring in Delhi Vidyapeetha adequate progress and it became a deemed university in 1989.

On 23 June 1989 the Government appointed Dr. Mishra as its first Vice-Chancellor. He started his life's journey from an evening school and got his first retirement as vice-chancellor in June 1994 and again Uttar Pradesh Administration appointed Dr. Mishra as vice-chancellor of Sampurnananda Sanskrit University, Varanasi on 1 January 1996 which glorifies Dr. Mishra's personality.

More than three years of his tenure there would remain remarkable in history of the university forever. He conducted timely examinations, regular sessions, publication of 115 books, completion of Saraswati temple and its enlighten ceremony, conducting two religious observance ceremony in the presence of two presidents of India, Shri Sankar Dayal Sharma and Shri K. R. Narayanan as chief guests are rare incidents in the history of the university. Dr. Murli Manohar Joshi's presence was also remarkable there.

Dr. Mishra founded Shri Pattaviram Shastri Veda Mimansa Research Centre in Varanasi paying as a homage to popular master sheer Acharya Shri Pattaviram Shastri that is in operation from a newly constructed grand building in Varanasi. Kanchi Sankaracharya also nominated him as the founder chairman of the centre.

Passing 

He died serving the Rajasthan Government as Vice-Chancellor, Rajasthan Sanskrit University.

References 

 
 

20th-century Indian educational theorists
Academic staff of the University of Rajasthan
1929 births
2001 deaths
Recipients of the Padma Shri in literature & education
People from Jaipur district
Indian Sanskrit scholars
Scholars from Rajasthan